Queen Esther is an 1878 painting by Edwin Long.

The painter drew upon travelogue illustrations in the British Museum in order to produce this vision of the biblical Queen Esther in Ahasuerus' palace at Susa.

The painting was first displayed in 1878 at the Royal Academy, and is now a part of the collection Pérez Simón.

The painting was meant to be hung next to a similar painting depicting Vashti.  It was housed in the Museum and Gallery at Bob Jones University for a time and is currently housed at the National Gallery of Victoria (NGV).

References 

19th-century paintings
1878 paintings
Paintings of Esther
Paintings by Edwin Long